The Welsh Pony and Cob is a group of four closelyrelated horse breeds including both pony and cob types, which originated in Wales in the United Kingdom. The four sections within the breed society for the Welsh breeds are primarily distinguished by height, and also by variations in type: the smallest Welsh Mountain Pony (Section A); the slightly taller but refined Welsh Pony of riding type (Section B) popular as a children's show mount; the small but stocky Welsh Pony of Cob Type (Section C), popular for riding and competitive driving; and the tallest, the Welsh Cob (Section D), which can be ridden by adults. Welsh ponies and cobs in all sections are known for their good temperament, hardiness, and free-moving gaits.

Native ponies existed in Wales before 1600 BC, and a Welsh-type cob was known as early as the Middle Ages. They were influenced by the Arabian horse, and possibly also by the Thoroughbred and the Hackney horse. In 1901, the first stud book for the Welsh breeds was established in the United Kingdom, and in 1907 another registry was established in the United States. Interest in the breed declined during the Great Depression, but revived in the 1950s. Throughout their history, the Welsh breeds have had many uses, including as a cavalry horse, a pit pony, and as a working animal on farms.

Today, the modern Welsh Pony and Cob breeds are used for many equestrian competitive disciplines, including showing, jumping, and driving, as well as for pleasure riding, trekking and trail riding. The smaller types are popular children's ponies. The Welsh also crosses well with many other breeds and has influenced the development of many British and American horse and pony breeds.

History 

Evidence suggests that a native pony existed in Wales before 1600 BC. The original Welsh Mountain Pony is thought to have evolved from this prehistoric Celtic pony. Welsh ponies were primarily developed in Wales, and their ancestors existed in the British Isles prior to the arrival of the Roman Empire. Bands of ponies roamed in a semi-feral state, climbing mountains, leaping ravines, and running over rough moorland terrain.

They developed into a hardy breed due to the harsh climate, limited shelter, and sparse food sources of their native country. At some point in their development, the Welsh breeds had some Arab blood added, although this did not take away the physical characteristics that make the breed unique.

The Welsh Cob existed as a type as early as the Middle Ages, and mentions of such animals can be found in medieval Welsh literature. During this time, they were known for their speed, jumping ability, and carrying capacity. Before the introduction of large, "coldblood" draught horse breeds, they were used for farm work and timbering. In 1485 the Welsh Militia, riding local animals presumed to be ancestors of the modern Welsh Cob, assisted Henry Tudor in gaining the English throne. During the 15th century, similar small horses were also used as rounceys, leading war horses known as destriers.

The characteristics of the breed as known today are thought to have been established by the late 15th century, after the Crusaders returned to England, with Arab stallions from the Middle East. In the 16th century, King Henry VIII, thinking to improve the breeds of horses, particularly war horses, ordered the destruction of all stallions under  and all mares under  in the Breed of Horses Act 1535. The laws for swingeing culls of 'under-height' horses were partially repealed by a decree by Queen Elizabeth I in 1566 on the basis that the poor lands could not support the weight of the horses desired by Henry VIII because of "their rottenness ... [they] are not able to breed beare and bring forth such great breeds of stoned horses as by the statute of 32 Henry VIII is expressed, without peril of miring and perishing of them", and (fortunately for the future of Britain's mountain and moorland pony breeds) many ponies in their native environments, including the Welsh breeds, therefore escaped the slaughter.

On the upland farms of Wales, Welsh ponies and cobs would often have to do everything from ploughing a field to carrying a farmer to market or driving a family to services on Sunday. When coal mining became important to the economy of the British Isles, many Welsh ponies were harnessed for use in mines, above and below ground.

In the 18th century and 19th century, more Arab blood was added by stallions who were turned out in the Welsh hills. Other breeds have also been added, including the Thoroughbred, Hackney, Norfolk Roadster, and the Yorkshire Coach Horse. Before the car was developed, the quickest mode of transport in Wales was the Welsh Cob. Tradesmen, doctors, and other businessmen often selected ponies by trotting them the 35 uphill miles from Cardiff to Dowlais. The best ponies could complete this feat in under three hours, never breaking gait. Formal breeding stock licensing was introduced in 1918, but before this, breeding stock was selected by such trotting tests.

In 1901 English and Welsh breeders established a breeders' association, the Welsh Pony and Cob Society, and the first stud book was published in 1902. It was decided that the Welsh Stud Book should be separated into sections divided by type and height. Welsh Ponies were originally only classified as Section A, but in 1931, with the rising demand for riding ponies for children, Section B was added. In the first stud books, the Section B was the Welsh Pony of Cob Type, and the Welsh Cob was Section C and Section D. The upper height limit for Section D Cobs was removed in 1907 and in 1931 Sections C and D were combined as simply Section C. The current standards of Cobs as Sections C and D were finalised in 1949. Until the mid 20th century, the British War Office considered the Welsh Cob so valuable that they paid premiums to the best stallions. After World War II, only three stallions were registered in Section C, but numbers have since recovered.

A small semi-feral population of about 120 animals still roams the Carneddau mountains in Snowdonia, Wales.

Welsh ponies were first exported to the United States in the 1880s, and large numbers were exported between 1884 and 1910. They adapted easily to the terrain and climate variations they encountered in Canada and the United States. An American association, also named the Welsh Pony and Cob Society, formed in 1906, and by 1913 a total of 574 ponies had been registered. During the Great Depression, interest in the breed declined, but made a comeback in the 1950s. The population continued to grow: in 1957, when annual studbooks began to be published, 2881 ponies had been registered; by 2009, the number was more than 34,000. All Welsh ponies and cobs in the United States descend from ponies registered in the UK stud-book.

Foundation lines
The stallion Dyoll Starlight was credited with being the foundation sire of the modern breed, and was a combination of Welsh and Arab breeding. From his line came an influential stallion of the Section B type: Tan-y-Bwlch Berwyn. This stallion was sired by a Barb and out of a mare from the Dyoll Starlight line. Influential stallions on the Section C and D bloodlines include: Trotting Comet, foaled in 1840 from a long line of trotting horses; True Briton, foaled in 1930, by a trotting sire and out of an Arab mare; Cymro Llwyd, foaled in 1850, by an Arab stallion and out of a trotting mare; and Alonzo the Brave, foaled in 1866, tracing his ancestry through the Hackney breed to the Darley Arabian.

Influence
The Welsh crosses well with many other breeds, and has influenced the Pony of the Americas and the British Riding Pony. Many are also cross-bred with Thoroughbreds, and other horse breeds. The Welsh Pony has contributed to the founding of several other horse and pony breeds. The Morgan horse is one such breed, being in part descended from Welsh Cobs left behind by British forces after the end of the American Revolutionary War. They are crossed with Arab horses to produce riding horses, and with Thoroughbreds to produce jumpers, hunters, and eventers. Welsh mares have also been used to breed polo ponies that were agile and nimble. The Welsh Pony was used to create the Welara, a cross-breed of the Welsh and the Arab horse, which has been registered in America as a separate breed since 1981.

Characteristics 

All sections of Welsh ponies and Cobs have small heads with large eyes, sloped shoulders, short backs and strong hindquarters. The forelegs are straight and the cannon bone short. The tail is high-set. They may be any solid colour, but not tobiano or leopard-spotted. Black, grey, chestnut and bay are the most common, but there are also buckskins and palominos. as well as smoky blacks and double creams. However, British equine colour terminology commonly refers to the buckskin colour, which is caused by the same cream dilution gene that produces palomino, as "dun", but the true dun gene is extremely rare in the Welsh breed due to it being bred out of most lines.

Their movement is bold, free and characteristically fast, especially at the trot, with great power coming from the hocks. Their trot has been favourably compared to that of the Standardbred horse. They are reputed to be trustworthy, of a good disposition with even temperaments and friendly characters, but spirited and with great endurance, and are known for their stamina, soundness, and high level of intelligence.

Sections

Uses 

The Welsh Pony has been put to many uses. Historically, they were used for postal routes and in coal mines. The British War Office used the Welsh Cob to pull heavy guns and equipment through terrain where motorised vehicles could not, and also used them for mounted infantry. Today, they are used as riding and driving ponies for both children and adults. Welshes today are also used in dressage, endurance riding, general riding, hunting, jumping, and work activities. They have proven their ability at driving in Fédération Équestre Internationale (FEI) level competition, and have been used for dressage. They also compete against one another in breed show competition as hunters, eventers, and western pleasure horses. The abilities of the Welsh Pony were showcased in 2008 when the first champion Large Pony Hunter to be made into a model Breyer horse was a grey Welsh Pony gelding.

References

External links 

 Cymdeithas y Merlod a'r Cobiau Cymreig (The Welsh Pony and Cob Society)	
 The Welsh Pony And Cob Society of Australia
 The Welsh Pony and Cob Society of America
 The Welsh Pony and Cob Society of Canada

Horse breeds
Feral horses
Horse breeds originating in Wales
Animal breeds on the RBST Watchlist
Ponies